Edi Rada (13 September 1922 – 13 July 1997) was an Austrian figure skater. He won the bronze medal at the 1948 Winter Olympics and was the 1949 European Champion. He won a bronze medal at the 1949  World Figure Skating Championships.

Results

References
 Skatabase: 1940s Worlds
 Skatabase: 1940s Europeans
 Database Olympics
 Listing as "deceased" at Sport-Komplett.de

Navigation

1922 births
1997 deaths
Austrian male single skaters
Figure skaters at the 1948 Winter Olympics
Olympic figure skaters of Austria
Olympic bronze medalists for Austria
Olympic medalists in figure skating
World Figure Skating Championships medalists
European Figure Skating Championships medalists
Medalists at the 1948 Winter Olympics